Jay Caselberg (born 1958) is an Australian science fiction writer. He has also used the name 'James Hartley' for some of his short fiction. His four novels to date are the Jack Stein series, comprising Wyrmhole, Metal Sky, The Star Tablet and Wall of Mirrors, published 2003-2006 by Roc Books. Subsequent works appeared mostly in the small press, comprising "Empties", "The Jackal Dreaming" as J.A Caselberg, "The Memory Box" and "Breath" as Jackson Creed.

References

Living people
21st-century Australian novelists
Australian male novelists
Australian male short story writers
University of Wollongong alumni
1958 births
21st-century Australian short story writers
21st-century Australian male writers